José Luis Moltó Carbonell (born 29 June 1975 in Cocentaina, Alicante) is a Spanish volleyball player who represented his native country at the 2000 Summer Olympics in Sydney, Australia. In 2007 he was a member of the men's national team that won the European title in Moscow, Russia.

Sporting achievements

National team
 1995  Universiade

Individual awards
 2007 European Championship "Best Blocker"
 2007 FIVB World Cup "Best Blocker"

References

  Spanish Olympic Committee

1975 births
Living people
People from Cocentaina
Spanish men's volleyball players
Volleyball players at the 2000 Summer Olympics
Olympic volleyball players of Spain
Mediterranean Games silver medalists for Spain
Competitors at the 2005 Mediterranean Games
Universiade medalists in volleyball
Mediterranean Games medalists in volleyball
Universiade silver medalists for Spain
Medalists at the 1995 Summer Universiade
Sportspeople from the Province of Alicante